Lionel is a given name which may refer to one of the following persons:

People
All male, unless otherwise noted.

Lionel (radio personality) (born 1958), an American radio talk show host
Lionel of Antwerp, 1st Duke of Clarence (1338–1368), son of King Edward III of England
Lionel Aingimea (born 1965), President of Nauru (2019–2022)
Lionel Algama (1935–2008), Sri Lankan Sinhala musician and composer
Lionel Antoine (born 1950), American retired National Football League player
Lionel Balagalle, general, Commander of the Sri Lanka Army from 2000 to 2004
Lionel Barber (born 1955), English journalist
Lionel Barrymore (1878–1954), American actor
Lionel Bart (1930–1999), British composer
Lionel Bender (1934–2008), American author and linguist
Lionel Blair (1928–2021), British dancer and actor
Lionel Bowen (1922–2012), Australian politician
Lionel Bussey (1883–1969), British engineer and collector of women's shoes
Lionel Cohen (disambiguation), various people
Lionel Cox (disambiguation), various people
Lionel Herbert Clarke (1859–1921), Canadian businessman and Lieutenant Governor of Ontario
Lionel Cranfield (disambiguation), various people
Lionel Cust (1859–1929), British art historian, courtier and museum director
Lionel Dyck (born 1944), Rhodesian-born mercenary
Lionel Fleury (1912–1997), Canadian ice hockey administrator
Lionel Henry Daiches (1911–1999) Scottish Queen's Counsel
Lionel Deraniyagala (1940–1994), Sri Lankan Sinhala cinema and theater actor
Lionel Dubray (1923–1944),  member of French Resistance during World War II
Lionel Dunsterville (1865–1946), British general
Lionel Edirisinghe (1913–1988), Sri Lankan Sinhala musicologist
Lionel Grigson (1942–1994), British jazz musician and educator 
Lionel Victor Gunaratna (1893–1971), Sri Lankan Sinhala army officer, educationist, municipal councilor
Lionel Hampton (1908–2002), American jazz musician, bandleader and actor
Lionel James (1962–2022), American football player
Lionel Jeffries (1926–2010), English actor, screenwriter and director
Lionel Johnson (1867–1902), English poet
Lionel Jospin (born 1937), French politician and Prime Minister of France (1997–2002)
Lionel Logue (1880–1953), Australian speech therapist and friend of King George VI
Lionel Manuel (born 1962), American retired National Football League player
Lionel Mapoe (born 1988), South African rugby union footballer
Lionel Messi (born 1987), Argentine footballer
Lionel Morgan (footballer) (born 1983), English footballer
Lionel Morgan (rugby league) (born 1938), Australian rugby league footballer
Lionel de Moustier (1817–1869), French diplomat and politician
Lionel Newman (1916–1989), American film & television composer who worked for 20th Century Fox
Lionel de Nicéville (1852–1901), English entomologist and curator
Lionel Nshole Makondi (born 1995), Belgian footballer
Lionel Penrose (1898–1972), British psychiatrist, medical geneticist, mathematician and chess theorist
Lionel Power (–1445), English composer
Lionel Price (1927–2019), British basketball player
Lionel Ranwala (1939–2002), Sri Lankan folk musician
Lionel Richie (born 1949), American singer, songwriter, musician, record producer and actor
Lionel Rivera (born 1956), American politician
Lionel Robbins, Baron Robbins (1898–1984), British economist and academic
Lionel Rose (1948–2011), Australian boxer
Lionel Rothschild (disambiguation), various people
Lionel Royce (1891–1946), Austrian-American actor
Lionel Royer-Perreaut (born 1972), French politician
Lionel Sackville-West, 2nd Baron Sackville (1827–1908), British diplomat
Lionel Scaloni (born 1978), Argentine footballer and current manager of the Argentina national team
Lionel Allen Sheldon (1828–1917), American politician and Governor of New Mexico Territory
Lionel Shriver (born 1957), American author
Lionel Simmons (born 1968), American retired National Basketball Association player
Lionel Stander (1908–1994), American actor
Lionel Taylor (born 1935), retired player in the American and National Football Leagues
Lionel Tennyson, 3rd Baron Tennyson (1889–1951), English cricketer
Lionel Tiger (born 1937), British anthropologist
Lionel Tollemache (disambiguation), various earls and baronets
Lionel Trilling (1905–1975), American literary critic
Lionel Wendt (1900–1944), Sri Lankan pianist, photographer, literature collector, critic, and cinematographer
Lionel Wigram, people of the same name:
Lionel Wigram (born 1962), British producer
Lionel Wigram (1907–1944), British Second World War soldier
Lionel Woodville (1446/1447–1484), Bishop of Salisbury

Fictional characters
Lion El'Jonson, a character in the Warhammer 40,000 universe, inspired by Lionel Johnson
Lionel Hutz, a recurring character in the television series The Simpsons
Lionel Lockridge, a character in the American soap opera Santa Barbara
Lionel Shrike, a character in the Now You See Me film series
Lionel Skeggins, a character in the New Zealand soap opera Shortland Street
Lionel Verney, the narrator in Mary Shelley's novel The Last Man
Sir Lionel, a knight of the Round Table in Arthurian legend
Lionel Jefferson, a character in the American sitcom The Jeffersons
Lionel, a Lion villager from the video game series Animal Crossing

Masculine given names
English masculine given names